In mathematics, and more specifically in order theory, several different types of ordered set have been studied.
They include:
 Cyclic orders, orderings in which triples of elements are either clockwise or counterclockwise
 Lattices, partial orders in which each pair of elements has a greatest lower bound and a least upper bound. Many different types of lattice have been studied; see map of lattices for a list.
 Partially ordered sets (or posets), orderings in which some pairs are comparable and others might not be
 Preorders, a generalization of partial orders allowing ties (represented as equivalences and distinct from incomparabilities)
 Semiorders, partial orders determined by comparison of numerical values, in which values that are too close to each other are incomparable; a subfamily of partial orders with certain restrictions
 Total orders, orderings that specify, for every two distinct elements, which one is less than the other
 Weak orders, generalizations of total orders allowing ties (represented either as equivalences or, in strict weak orders, as transitive incomparabilities)
 Well-orders, total orders in which every non-empty subset has a least element
 Well-quasi-orderings, a class of preorders generalizing the well-orders

See also

 Glossary of order theory
 List of order theory topics

Mathematics-related lists
Order theory